Sid Prior (born 17 February 1943) is an Australian boxer. He competed in the men's lightweight event at the 1960 Summer Olympics.

References

1943 births
Living people
Australian male boxers
Olympic boxers of Australia
Boxers at the 1960 Summer Olympics
Boxers from Sydney
Lightweight boxers